Sălăgeni may refer to several villages in Romania:

 Sălăgeni, a village in Grozești Commune, Iași County
 Sălăgeni, a village in Dumbrăveni Commune, Suceava County